Herrity is a surname. Notable people with the surname include:

Redmond Herrity, Irish sculptor